The  Cama & Albless Hospital (originally just Cama Hospital) is a hospital for women and children in the city of Mumbai, India, with 367 beds.

History 

The foundation stone was laid by H.R.H. the Duke of Connaught on 22 November 1883 and the building formally opened on 30 July 1886. The building was designed in Medieval Gothic style by Khan Bahadoor Muncherjee Cowasjee Murzban. The building is made from stone obtained from Porbander. Pestonjee Hormusjee Cama, is a Parsi philanthropist who contributed  (~₹43 crore in 2020) to its construction. The staffing was provided through the Medical Women for India Fund. The Cama Hospital later employed Edith Pechey, one of the original cohort of female medical students at the University of Edinburgh (1869).

References

External links 

 Cama and Albless Hospital - listing at the India Education Network
 Cama & Albless Hospital, Mumbai
 Cama Albless Hospital (Dhobi Talao; 367 beds - Municipal hospitals in Mumbai)
 Nitin Yeshwantrao and Hemali Chhapia, "Panic-stricken patients walk out of Cama hospital", Times of India, 28 November 2008.
 Tata donation to the hospital

Hospitals in Mumbai
Children's hospitals in India
Municipal hospitals in India
Hospitals established in 1886
1886 establishments in British India